Yiu On Estate is a public housing estate in Ma On Shan, New Territories, Hong Kong. It is the second public housing estate in Ma On Shan and has seven blocks built on the reclaimed land between Ma On Shan Road and Sai Sha Road in 1988. Some of the flats were sold to the tenants through Tenants Purchase Scheme Phase 2 in 1999.

Kam Hay Court is a Home Ownership Scheme court in Ma On Shan, near Yiu On Estate. It consists of three blocks built in 1989.

Houses

Yiu On Estate

Kam Hay Court

Demographics
According to the 2016 by-census, Yiu On Estate had a population of 14,017 while Kam Hay Court had a population of 3,097. Altogether the population amounts to 17,114.

Politics
Yiu On Estate and Kam Hay Court are located in Yiu On constituency of the Sha Tin District Council. It is currently represented by Kelvin Sin Cheuk-nam, who was elected in the 2019 elections.

COVID-19 pandemic
Yiu Ping House of the estate was under lockdown for mandatory test between 16 & 18 February, 2022. At least 64 preliminary positive Covid cases was found.

See also

Public housing estates in Ma On Shan

References

Residential buildings completed in 1988
Ma On Shan
Public housing estates in Hong Kong
Tenants Purchase Scheme